Aftermath with William Shatner is an American television show hosted by William Shatner.

Overview
Aftermath with William Shatner takes viewers back to dramatic events that shocked the world.  Subjects of the series include The Unabomber, Randy Weaver, Jessica Lynch, and Bernhard Goetz.

References

External links
 

2010 American television series debuts
2011 American television series endings
2010s American television news shows
The Biography Channel shows
English-language television shows